Englerodaphne is a genus of flowering plants belonging to the family Thymelaeaceae.

Its native range is from southern Sudan to southern Africa; it is found in Cape Provinces, KwaZulu-Natal and Northern Provinces (of South Africa), Kenya, Sudan, Tanzania and Uganda.

The genus name of Englerodaphne is in honour of Adolf Engler (1844–1930), a German botanist, and also daphne, a genus of evergreen shrubs in the family Thymelaeaceae. It was first published and described in Bot. Jahrb. Syst. Vol.19 on page 274 in 1894. 

Species known:
Englerodaphne pilosa 
Englerodaphne subcordata

References

Thymelaeaceae
Malvales genera
Plants described in 1894
Flora of South Africa
Flora of Kenya
Flora of Sudan
Flora of Tanzania
Flora of Uganda